Rebels of the Neon God is a 1992 Taiwanese drama film written and directed by Tsai Ming-liang in his feature film directorial debut. It stars Lee Kang-sheng, Chen Chao-jung, and Jen Chang-bin.

Plot
A young man, Hsiao-Kang, attends a cram school and lives with his parents. In a parallel storyline, Tze and Ping are petty thieves. After a night out, Tze returns to his flooded apartment. The next morning, he meets Kuei, a young woman who had just had a one-night stand in the neighboring room with Ah-Tze's brother, a car salesman. Kuei does not know where she is, and Tze gives her a ride on his motorcycle. Meanwhile, Hsiao-Kang's motorcycle is impounded. His father, a taxi driver, spots him and gives him a ride to school. During an altercation in traffic, Tze intentionally breaks the side mirror on Hsiao-Kang's father's taxi.

Tze, Ping, and Kuei hang out together at night and get drunk. Kuei passes out, and the two men leave her in a hotel room. In the morning, Kuei calls Tze and asks to see him again. Meanwhile, Hsiao-Kang drops out of school and gets a refund. Rather than going home, he stays out, runs into Tze, and stalks him for a while. Hsiao-Kang watches Tze and Ping rob an arcade by taking motherboards out of the machines.

Tze meets Kuei, who is angry that he stood her up. The two get a hotel room and have sex. Meanwhile, Hsiao-Kang finds Tze's motorcycle and vandalizes it. He then tries to return home after being away for a few days, but his parents, who have discovered that he dropped out of school, refuse to let him in. He ends up staying in the same hotel where Tze and Kuei spent the night and watches gleefully as Tze discovers his trashed bike.

Later, Tze and Ping try to sell the motherboards to an arcade owner, but the men they stole from confront them, chase them into the street, and beat Ping up. That night, Tze brings Ping back to his apartment, by chance in Hsiao-Kang's father's taxi. Kuei also shows up there. She tells Tze that she wants to go away with him, and the two embrace. Hsiao-Kang's father drives back home, and he leaves the apartment door ajar. Hsiao-Kang visits a phone dating service but does not answer any calls. After a few minutes, he leaves.

Cast
 Lee Kang-sheng as Hsiao Kang
 Chen Chao-jung as Ah Tze
 Jen Chang-bin as Ah Ping
 Wang Yu-wen as Ah Kuei
 Lu Yi-ching as Hsiao Kang's mother
 Miao Tien as Hsiao Kang's father

Production
Rebels of the Neon God was Tsai's first feature film. He had taken a liking to Lee Kang-sheng when the two worked together on a television film. At the time, Lee was studying for college entrance exams. Tsai later said, "It was by spending time with Hsiao-Kang as he went through the whole experience that I decided that I wanted to make a simple film about a kid trying to get into college, which became Rebels of the Neon God. I wanted to explore what a kid would do if he couldn't get in. Where would he go? What would he do?"

Title
The Taiwanese title refers to Nezha, a powerful child god in Chinese classical mythology who was born into a human family. Nezha is impulsive and disobedient. He tries to kill his father, but is brought under control when a Taoist immortal (Nezha's spiritual mentor) gives the father a miniature pagoda that enables him to control his rebellious son. This resonates in the film a number of ways: Hsiao-Kang's mother believes that he is Nezha reincarnated, and Tze and Ping try to pawn off some stolen goods to an arcade proprietor named Nezha. Before the pawning of the stolen goods, Hsiao-Kang vandalizes Tze's motorcycle and writes "Nezha was here" on the adjacent sidewalk.

Reception
On review aggregator website Rotten Tomatoes, the film has an approval rating of 100% based on 32 reviews, with a weighted average of 8.55/10. The site's consensus reads: "Rebels of the Neon God announces writer-director Ming-liang Tsai as a fully formed talent—and remains one of the more accomplished debuts of the decade". On Metacritic, the film has a score of 82 out of 100 based on 10 reviews, indicating "universal acclaim".

Awards
The film won a Golden Horse Award for Best Original Score, a Prize of the City of Torino for Best Film at the Torino International Festival of Young Cinema, and the Bronze Award at the Tokyo International Film Festival.

See also
 List of films with a 100% rating on Rotten Tomatoes

References

External links
 
 
 
 Interview: Rebels of the Neon God 青少年哪吒

1992 films
1992 drama films
Central Motion Picture Corporation films
Films directed by Tsai Ming-liang
Films with screenplays by Tsai Ming-liang
1990s Mandarin-language films
Taiwanese drama films
1992 directorial debut films